Federalsburg is a town in Caroline County, Maryland, United States. The population was 2,739 at the 2010 United States Census. It has one high school, Colonel Richardson High School.

History
According to a contemporary source, the town was named for the Federalist Party, which met there in 1812, and was incorporated in 1823. A 1905 source says that Federalsburg was so named because it was settled by people from northern states.

Geography
Federalsburg is located at  (38.691126, -75.773296).

Demographics

2010 census
As of the census of 2010, there were 2,739 people, 1,081 households, and 708 families living in the town. The racial makeup of the town was 53.8% White, 41.0% African American, 0.3% Native American, 0.8% Asian, 1.3% from other races, and 2.8% from two or more races. Hispanic or Latino of any race were 3.6% of the population.

There were 1,081 households, of which 41.0% had children under the age of 18 living with them, 31.8% were married couples living together, 26.9% had a female householder with no husband present, 6.8% had a male householder with no wife present, and 34.5% were non-families. 29.3% of all households were made up of individuals, and 11.5% had someone living alone who was 65 years of age or older. The average household size was 2.53 and the average family size was 3.10.

The median age in the town was 33.3 years. 30.8% of residents were under the age of 18; 9.5% were between the ages of 18 and 24; 24.3% were from 25 to 44; 23.1% were from 45 to 64; and 12.5% were 65 years of age or older. The gender makeup of the town was 45.2% male and 54.8% female.

2000 census
As of the census of 2000, there were 2,620 people, 1,045 households, and 714 families living in the town. The racial makeup of the town was 58.93% White, 36.83% African Americans, 0.31% Native American, 0.65% Asian, 0.04% Pacific Islander, 0.38% from other races, and 2.86% from two or more races. Hispanic or Latino of any race were 1.11% of the population.

There were 1,045 households, out of which 37.1% had children under the age of 18 living with them, 38.4% were married couples living together, 25.0% had a female householder with no husband present, and 31.6% were non-families. 27.3% of all households were made up of individuals, and 13.8% had someone living alone who was 65 years of age or older. The average household size was 2.51 and the average family size was 2.97.

In the town, the age distribution of the population shows 30.8% under the age of 18, 9.7% from 18 to 24, 26.0% from 25 to 44, 19.4% from 45 to 64, and 14.2% who were 65 years of age or older. The median age was 33 years. For every 100 females, there were 81.8 males. For every 100 females age 18 and over, there were 74.9 males.

The median income for a household in the town was $24,266, and the median income for a family was $32,059. Males had a median income of $28,438 versus $21,296 for females. The per capita income for the town was $13,878. About 21.0% of families and 25.3% of the population were below the poverty line, including 35.2% of those under age 18 and 18.2% of those age 65 or over.

Transportation

The primary means of travel to and from Federalsburg is by road. The primary state highways serving the town are Maryland Route 318, which runs east-west, and Maryland Route 313, which runs north-south. The two roads are concurrent for much of their passage through Federalsburg, which has been diverted to the southern and western edges of town via a bypass. Other state highways serving the town include Maryland Route 307, Maryland Route 308 and Maryland Route 315. In addition, Maryland Route 306 ends at the northeast edge of town.

Economy 
Crystal Steel Fabricators Inc. is contracted to produce components for Ørsted offshore wind projects in Maryland and New Jersey.

Arts and culture
Exeter was listed on the National Register of Historic Places in 1978.

The town hosted the 58th Annual Delmarva Chicken Festival in 2007 at Marshy Hope Marina Park, the second time it has done so.

Sports
Federalsburg was host to three Eastern Shore Baseball League minor league teams – the Athletics, Little A's, and Feds.

Government

Town officials and staff
 Mayor: Kimberly Jahnigen Abner
 Council President: Scott Phillips
 Council Members: David Morean, Debra Varady Sewell, Edward H. Windsor
 Chief of Police: Michael A. McDermott
 Town Manager: Lawrence DiRe
 Clerk-Treasurer: Kristy L. Marshall
 Deputy Clerk: Melissa D. Hrobar
 Accounting Clerk: Kimberly M. Brown
 Main Street Manager/Grants Administrator: vacant
 Code Enforcement Officer: John Garlick
 Public Works Director: Steve Dyott

Media
Federalsburg is the home of the radio station WTDK also known as THE DUCK.

Notable people
 Robert "Ducky" Detweiler, former professional baseball player with the Boston Braves from 1942 to 1946.
 Robert Houston Noble, U.S. Army brigadier general
 Madeline Hurlock, actress

References

External links
 

 
Towns in Maryland
Towns in Caroline County, Maryland